Mr Sin may refer to:

 Mr Sin (Doctor Who), fictional pig-cyborg in the serial The Talons of Weng-Chiang
 Abe Saffron (1919–2006), Australian criminal
 Mr Sin: The Abe Saffron dossier, a book by Tony Reeves about an Australian criminal.